Dal Bahadur Kori (1956/1957 – 6 May 2021) was an Indian politician and a member of 17th Legislative Assembly, Uttar Pradesh of India. He represented the 'Salon' constituency in Rae Bareli district of Uttar Pradesh.

Political career
Kori contested Uttar Pradesh Assembly Election as Bharatiya Janata Party candidate and defeated his close contestant Suresh Chaudhary from Indian National Congress with a margin of 16,055 votes.

Kori died, aged 64, on 6 May 2021 from complications of COVID-19.

Posts held

References

Year of birth missing
1950s births
2021 deaths
Bharatiya Janata Party politicians from Uttar Pradesh
Uttar Pradesh MLAs 2017–2022
People from Raebareli district
Deaths from the COVID-19 pandemic in India